Ban Nam Di is a village in Luang Namtha Province, Laos, located about  northeast of Luang Namtha. It has a population of about 500. The village is famous for its bamboo paper making by the Lanten peoples. The locals are adept at turning bamboo into pulp on the river banks and making paper by spreading it thinly over square cotton screens. The paper is usually primarily for Taoist religious purposes, but in recent years the  villagers have been producing it as souvenirs for tourists. The houses in the village are mainly made with bamboo roofs.

References

External links
Photograph
Photos of Luang Namtha Province
Ecotourism in Laos
Map of Louang Nam Tha Province
Populated places in Luang Namtha Province